Likhachyov (masculine) or Likhachyova (feminine), alternatively spelled Likhachev/Likhacheva  or Likhachov/Likhachova, is a Russian surname shared by:
Dmitry Likhachov (1906–1999), Russian language and literature scholar
Galina Likhachova (born 1977), Russian speed skater
Nikolay Likhachyov (1862–1936), Russian sigillographer
Valery Likhachov (born 1947), Russian cyclist
Vasily Likhachyov (1952–2019), Russian politician
Yegor Ligachyov (1920–2021), Soviet politician 

Russian-language surnames